{{Multiple issues|

The Native American Music Awards (also known as the NAMAs or "Nammys") are an awards program presented annually by Elbel Productions, Inc., The Native American Music Awards Inc., and The Native American Music Association, a 501(c)(3) non-profit organization incorporated in 1998, which recognizes outstanding musical achievement in styles associated with Native Americans, predominantly in the United States and Canada. 

While Native American performers in a variety of genres are also recognized, nominees do not have to be Native American themselves. The organization was founded by music industry executive Ellen Bello in 1998, with the aim of offering Native American musicians greater recognition from the American music industry and to create opportunities for international exposure and recognition. They state that their Annual Native American Music Awards is the largest membership-based organization for Native American music initiatives and consists of over 20,000 registered voting members and professionals in the field. They report holding the largest Native American music library in the world with a national archive featuring a collection of over 10,000 audio and video recordings in all formats housed since 1990.

Awards show
The awards show honors national recordings released in the previous calendar year that encompass traditional and contemporary Native American music instrumentation and/or lyrics. Traditional music through history has been an integral part of Native American life and tribal identity, for example: pow wow music, round dance songs, and Native American flute music. Contemporary Native American music has grown to encompass many popular genres (for example: rock, pop, blues, hip hop, and country), as well as uniquely distinctive genres including Waila (or Chicken scratch) and Native American Church music. There is also a "Native Heart category", an award given specifically to non-native artists in the field.

Nominees are submitted and selected by a national advisory membership, consisting of professionals who pay an annual membership to join the organization. Winners are selected by a combined vote by the national membership and the general public, who can listen to and vote on nominees' songs featured on the Native American Music Awards website.

The awards ceremony features live artist performances and 30 awards categories in various traditional and contemporary music genres, as well as Lifetime Achievement Awards and Hall of Fame inductions.  The program often reaches beyond talent from Indian reservations and embraces internationally renowned artists such as; Robbie Robertson, Rita Coolidge, John Densmore, Nelly Furtado, Rickey Medlocke, Felipe Rose, and others.

Other mainstream celebrities who have supported the Native American Music Awards include: Nile Rodgers, Richie Havens, Wayne Newton, Jennifer Warnes, Bruce Cockburn, Crystal Gayle, Kitty Wells, Mickey Hart of the Grateful Dead, Janice Marie Johnson of A Taste of Honey, KC of KC and the Sunshine Band, Little Steven Van Zandt, Nokie Edwards, and more.

Awards
The dedicated Native American Music Awards successfully proposed the Grammy Award for Best Native American Music Album in 2000. The Native American Music Awards or N.A.M.A. was the first national awards program for Native American music in North America. The Awards was born out of a need for greater recognition for Native American music initiatives and remains the largest professional membership based organization in the world.

From 2001 to 2011, the American Grammy Awards presented an annual award for Best Native American Music Album, and the Canadian Juno Awards present an annual award for Aboriginal Recording of the Year. On April 6, 2011, it was announced that the Grammy Award for Best Native American Music Album would be merged into a new category, Best Regional Roots Music Album.

The awards ceremonies have typically been hosted by the Seneca Nation of New York's casinos since approximately 2010, first at the Seneca Niagara Casino for the first several years and in 2014 at the Seneca Allegany Casino. The Senecas have also sporadically broadcast the awards ceremonies on their owned-and-operated station, WGWE.

Lifetime Achievement Awards and Hall of Fame inductions 
Another feature of the Native American Music Awards is the Lifetime Achievement Awards and Hall of Fame inductions:

Native American Music Awards Hall of Fame  

 Jimi Hendrix (self-identified Cherokee descent), 1998
 Buddy Red Bow (Oglala Lakota),1998
 Hank Williams, 1999
 Jim Pepper (Kaw/Muscogee Creek), 2000
 Crystal Gayle (self-identified Cherokee descent), 2001
 Kitty Wells, 2002
 Doc Tate Nevaquaya (Comanche Nation), 2006
 Link Wray (self-identified Shawnee descent), 2007
 Redbone (Yaqui/Shoshone descent), 2008
 Rickey Medlocke of Lynyrd Skynyrd/Blackfoot, 2008
 Janice-Marie Johnson (Stockbridge-Munsee descent) of A Taste of Honey, 2008
 Felipe Rose of Village People (Lakota descent), 2008
 Ritchie Valens (Yaqui), 2009
 Nokie Edwards (Cherokee), 2011
 Keith Secola (Ojibwe), 2011
 Russell Means (Oglala Lakota), 2013
 Taboo (Shoshone), 2016
 Mickie James (self-identified Powhatan descent), 2017
 Jesse Ed Davis (Kiowa/Comanche), 2018
 Wes Studi (Cherokee Nation), 2019

Lifetime Achievement Awards 
 Robbie Robertson (Mohawk), 1998
 Rita Coolidge (self-identified Cherokee descent), 1999
 Tom Bee of XIT (Dakota descent), 2000
 R. Carlos Nakai (Navajo/Ute), 2001
 John Densmore, 2003
 Tiger Tiger (Miccosukee), 2007
 Joanne Shenandoah (Oneida), 2008
 Bill Miller (Stockbridge-Munsee), 2008
 Stevie Salas (Apache descent), 2009
 John Trudell (Santee Dakota), Living Legend, 1998
 Navajo Code talkers (Navajo), Living Legend, 1999
 The Neville Brothers, Living Legend, 2001
 Floyd Red Crow Westerman (Santee Dakota), Living Legend, 2002
 Tommy Allsup (Cherokee), Living Legend, 2009
 Saginaw Grant, (Sac And Fox)Living Legend, 2016

See also
 Grammy Award for Best Native American Music Album
 List of Native American musicians
 Native American music

References

External links
 

American music awards
Awards established in 1998
Music awards honoring indigenous people
Native American music
Native American music albums
Native American musical groups
1998 establishments in the United States